Margaret Patricia Munn (born 1959) is the first Independent Chair of the Church of England’s National Safeguarding Panel,
ProChancellor and Deputy Chair of the Board of Governors of Sheffield Hallam University and the Senior Independent Director of the Phone-paid Services Authority. Previously she was Chair of the British Council's Society Advisory Group (2017-21) and a Non-Executive Director of the Esh Group (2015-18).

She is  also an international governance consultant with a focus on parliamentary processes, political party development, gender mainstreaming and women's leadership. She works with organisations such as Global Partners Governance, Inter-Parliamentary Union, United Nations Development Programme, the Office for Democratic Institutions and Human Rights, Commonwealth Parliamentary Association, UN Women, the Kenya Women Parliamentarians’ Association (KEWOPA) and the Iraq Foundation to support democracy building in a number of countries. She is author of Participatory Gender Audits of Parliaments: a Step by Step Guidance Document (2022) and Lead drafter for the Compendium of Good Practises for Advancing Women's Political Participation in the OSCE Region (2016), Office for Democratic Institutions and Human Rights. 

She supports women to consider non-traditional careers in science, technology, engineering and mathematics (STEM), and construction. She is Patron of the Women's Engineering Society and has edited Building the future: women in construction, Smith Institute (2014) and Unlocking Potential: perspectives on women in science, engineering & technology, Smith Institute (2011).

Munn was the British MP for Sheffield Heeley from 2001 to 2015. On 24 January 2014 she advised Heeley Constituency Labour Party that she had decided not to seek reselection to stand at the 2015 general election.

Before Parliament
Munn went to Mundella Primary School on Mundella Place in Norton Woodseats, then the comprehensive Rowlinson School on Dyche Lane in Jordanthorpe, Sheffield from 1970 to 1977, (the site became Norton College Campus of Sheffield College, but the old school transferred to Meadowhead School across the road in 1988).

She studied languages at the University of York receiving a BA (Hons) in 1981, later gaining an MA in social work at the University of Nottingham in 1986. Munn later gained a Certificate and Diploma in Management Studies from the Open University and in 2012 became the first MP to be awarded Chartered Manager status by the Chartered Management Institute, subsequently becoming a Fellow of the Institute.

She worked as a social work Assistant for Berkshire County Council from 1981–84; as a social worker for Nottinghamshire County Council from 1986–90, becoming a senior social worker from 1990–92; as a district manager for Barnsley Metropolitan Borough Council Social Services from 1992–96, as a child services manager for Wakefield Metropolitan Borough Council from 1996–99; and assistant director of City of York Council Children's Services from 1999–2000.

She joined the Labour Party at fifteen, and was a councillor on Nottingham City Council from 1987–91. Munn was on the Barnsley Regional Board of the Co-operative Group, the UK's largest co-operative society, and the management committee of Wortley Hall, a national co-operative conference centre. She was elected President of the 2006 Co-operative Congress She is a member of USDAW, the Labour Party and the Co-operative Party.

Member of Parliament

Munn was Patron of Heeley City Farm, Patron of Home-Start Sheffield and Patron of Sheffield Young Carers.

As a backbencher, Munn served on the Education and Skills Select Committee 2001–03, and the Procedure Select Committee 2001–02. She was closely involved with the Adoption and Children Act 2002; changing national regulations to allow Local Authorities to register body-piercing studios; supporting small business, including co-operative and mutual enterprises; encouraging women to go into business; and House of Lord's reform. She also served as Chair of the Women's Committee of the Parliamentary Labour Party (2003–05) and Chair of the Parliamentary Co-operative Group (2004–05). She has been Vice-Chair of Labour Friends of Israel, a vice-chair of the group Progress and Chair of the All-Party Parliamentary Voice group.

Munn served as Parliamentary Private Secretary at the Department for Education and Skills from July 2003 to 2004 and then continuing to be a PPS at the department attached to the Minister of State for Education until May 2005. She was Minister for Women and Equality, based at the Department for Communities and Local Government from May 2005 until June 2007. Munn introduced civil partnerships in the UK in December 2005. She was responsible for the Equality Act 2006, and involved in the Work and Families Act 2006. She established the Equality and Human Rights Commission). She was not able to take a ministerial salary, as the maximum number of paid ministers, had been appointed.  This was criticised by the opposition.

Munn argued strongly in support of the coalition government's plan to participate in military strikes against the Syrian Government in the wake of a chemical-weapons attack at Ghouta in the vote on 29 August 2013, contrary to the Labour Party's position. She was one of four Labour MPs that did not vote against the government motion, which the government lost. Ultimately a negotiated agreement was reached to eliminate Syria's chemical weapons.

On 29 June 2007, Munn was appointed as the Parliamentary Under-Secretary of State for Foreign Affairs in the Foreign and Commonwealth Office. She had responsibility for Overseas Territories, South East Asia, Australia, New Zealand and the Caribbean and Central America among other things. She stood down from the government in October 2008.

She was Chair of the UK government funded Westminster Foundation for Democracy from October 2008 to July 2010, and Vice-Chair July 2010 to October 2012.
With the Foundation, Munn worked in the Middle East and North Africa, leading workshops and mentoring MPs in Egypt, the Kurdistan region of Iraq, Morocco and Jordan. The Foundation was established in 1992 to promote democracy mainly in Eastern Europe, the Middle East and Africa. It is a cross-party political organisation that provides funds, supports projects and arranges training in the nuts and bolts of establishing and keeping democratic forms of government.

Munn established and was chair of the Child Protection All-Party Parliamentary Group, Chair of the Kurdistan Region of Iraq All-Party Parliamentary Group, Chair of the Methodist All-Party Parliamentary Group, Vice-Chair of the Women in Enterprise All-Party Parliamentary Group, Vice-Chair of the Engineering and Information Technology All-Party Parliamentary Group, Vice-Chair of the Yorkshire and North Lincolnshire All-Party Parliamentary Group, and Vice-Chair of the Mexican All-Party Parliamentary Group.

Expenses claims

On 26 May 2009, Meg Munn was criticised after it was alleged by The Daily Telegraph that her husband, who is also employed part-time as her parliamentary aide, received more than £5,000 over four years of public money claimed for by Members of the Parliamentary Labour Party, including Government Ministers, for assistance completing their personal tax forms. Munn charged the taxpayer for the tax advice she received herself from her own husband. It was alleged that when she published the receipt on her website, she blacked out the portion indicating that her husband was the beneficiary of her expenses.
However the blacking out had been done by the House of Commons authorities, presumably in error as they only blacked out his name for one year but left the other three years alone. Munn stated none of the information available on her website had information blacked out by her or any of her staff.

Labour MPs have argued that tax advice relating to their work is a legitimate expense, and the Labour Party issued a statement suggesting that "Many MPs rightly seek professional assistance and advice where this relates specifically to their role as Members of Parliament and the expense is therefore legitimate and justifiable. The purpose of this is to ensure all tax liabilities connected with parliamentary duties are properly dealt with." Business groups expressed concerns said MPs might be being "treated differently" to other taxpayers. Saying, "If entrepreneurs sought professional tax advice, they had to pay the fee themselves and offset it against any profits on which they paid tax". Munn was one of 98 MPs who voted in favour of legislation which would have kept MPs expense details secret.

Personal life
She is fluent in German and French, conversational Italian and Spanish and is learning basic Arabic and Swahili. Munn has been an active member of the Methodist Church for 30 years. She is married to Dennis Bates.

Publications
Author Participatory Gender Audits of Parliaments: a Step by Step Guidance Document Office for Democratic Institutions and Human Rights (2022).
Lead drafter "Compendium of Good Practises for Advancing Women's Political Participation in the OSCE Region", Office for Democratic Institutions and Human Rights (2016).
Edited Building the future: women in construction, Smith Institute (2014).
Seminar series on child sexual abuse, Child Protection All-Party Parliamentary Group. NSPCC (2014).
Making care proceedings better for children, Child Protection All-Party Parliamentary Group.NSPCC (2013).
Edited Unlocking Potential: perspectives on women in science, engineering & technology, Smith Institute (2011).
Vetting and Disclosures: Getting it right in practice, Child Protection All-Party Parliamentary Group.NSPCC (2011).
An essay in Making the progressive case for Israel, Labour Friends of Israel (2011).
President's Address to the Co-operative Congress, Co-operatives UK (2006).
Foreword to Diversity and the Economy, Tony Pilch, Smith Institute (2006).
An essay in Labour Looks to Israel, ed P.Richards, Labour Friends of Israel (2005).
Co-edited Family Fortunes: the New Politics of Childhood, eds Patrick Diamond, Sunder Katwala & Meg Munn, Fabian Society (2004)

References

External links
Her website
Guardian Unlimited Politics – Ask Aristotle: Meg Munn MP
TheyWorkForYou.com – Meg Munn MP
Voting record at the Public Whip
Women and Equality Unit
BBC Politics page

 

1959 births
Living people
Labour Co-operative MPs for English constituencies
Alumni of the University of Nottingham
Politics of Sheffield
Female members of the Parliament of the United Kingdom for English constituencies
Alumni of the Open University
UK MPs 2001–2005
UK MPs 2005–2010
Alumni of the University of York
Presidents of Co-operative Congress
UK MPs 2010–2015
Nottingham City Councillors
21st-century British women politicians
21st-century English women
21st-century English people
Women councillors in England